The rectovaginal fascia (often called rectovaginal septum or sometimes fascia of Otto) is a thin structure separating the vagina and the rectum.    This corresponds to the rectoprostatic fascia in the male.

Clinical significance
Perforations in it can lead to rectocele.

References

External links
 http://www.emedicinehealth.com/vaginal_prolapse/page18_em.htm

Pelvis
Fascia